Maasdam is a village and former administrative land division in the Netherlands.

Maasdam may also refer to:

 Maasdam cheese

Ships
 SS Maasdam (1889), a Dutch ocean liner
 , a cargo liner sunk in 1941
 , another Dutch ocean liner
 , a cruise ship